Metsaääre may refer to several places in Estonia:

Metsaääre, Pärnu County, village in Surju Parish, Pärnu County
Metsaääre, Kehtna Parish, village in Kehtna Parish, Rapla County
Metsaääre, Märjamaa Parish, village in Märjamaa Parish, Rapla County
Metsaääre, Saare County, village in Leisi Parish, Saare County